Mariano Ondo Monsuy Angong (29 June 1999 – 14 September 2022) was an Equatoguinean footballer who played as a right back. He represented Equatorial Guinea at under-23 and senior levels.

Club career
Ondo has played club football for Cano Sport Academy and Shkupi. At the time of his death, he was expected to join Spanish club Rápido de Bouzas, after paperwork issues had been solved successfully - he had trained in that team during the 2021-22 season with a tourist visa, which prevented him from playing.

International career
Ondo made his international debut for Equatorial Guinea in 2017.

Death
Ondo died whilst training with the Equatorial Guinea national team on 14 September 2022, at the age of 23.

References

1999 births
2022 deaths
People from Wele-Nzas
Equatoguinean footballers
Association football fullbacks
Cano Sport Academy players
FK Shkupi players
Macedonian First Football League players
Equatorial Guinea A' international footballers
2018 African Nations Championship players
Equatorial Guinea international footballers
Equatoguinean expatriate footballers
Equatoguinean expatriate sportspeople in North Macedonia
Expatriate footballers in North Macedonia
Sport deaths in Africa
Association football players who died while playing